The Trac 16 (sometimes styled as the TRAC-16 or Trac-16) is an American catamaran sailboat that was designed by Steve Nichols as a day sailer and first built in 1983.

Production
The design was built in the United States by the AMF Alcort division of American Machine and Foundry, starting in 1983. A total of 600 boats were completed, but it is now out of production.

Design
The Trac 16 is a recreational sailing dinghy, with a fractional sloop rig and its hulls built of fiberglass. The hulls have raked stems and plumb transoms with dual transom-hung rudders controlled by a tiller. The boat displaces .

The boat has no keels, but the hulls are asymmetrical and the "banana" shape provides some counter to leeway when sailing upwind.

See also
List of multihulls
List of sailing boat types

Related development
Trac 14

Similar sailboats
Hobie 16

References

External links

Video - Sailing a Trac 16
Video - Tacking a Trac 16 

Dinghies
Catamarans
1980s sailboat type designs
Sailboat type designs by Steve Nichols
Sailboat types built by American Machine and Foundry